The Chevrolet Bolt or Chevrolet Bolt EV is a battery electric subcompact hatchback produced by General Motors under the Chevrolet marque. It was developed and manufactured in partnership with LG Corporation. A rebadged European variant was sold as the Opel Ampera-e in mainland Europe, but was discontinued after 2018.

Sales of the 2017 Bolt began in California in December 2016, with nationwide US and international markets release in 2017. The Bolt was the U.S. second best selling plug-in car in 2017. Global combined Bolt/Ampera-e family sales totaled 112,000 units by the end of 2020.

The Bolt was named the 2017 Motor Trend Car of the Year, the 2017 North American Car of the Year, an Automobile magazine 2017 All Star, and was listed in Time magazine's Best 25 Inventions of 2016.

The Bolt has been subject to a number of recalls, with concerns over the battery pack spontaneously catching fire.

History

Development 
GM Korea began developing the Bolt in 2012 with a team of 180 people with the project code G2KCZ (G2 for Gamma 2nd-generation platform, K for hatchback, C for Chevrolet, and Z for electric car). Its initial concept debuted at the 2015 North American International Auto Show.

, General Motors had tested more than 50 Bolt prototypes hand-built at the General Motors Proving Grounds in Milford, Michigan. The cars were tested at Proving Grounds and overseas for ride and handling dynamics, cabin comfort, quietness, charging capability, and energy efficiency.

Alan Batey, head of General Motors North America, announced in February 2015 that the Bolt EV was headed for production, and would be available in all 50 states. GM also has plans to sell the Bolt in select global markets.

In January 2016, at the Consumer Electronics Show in Las Vegas, the production version of the Chevrolet Bolt was unveiled. Barra projected in February 2016 that the European version, marketed as the Opel Ampera-e (or Vauxhall Ampera-e in the United Kingdom), would enter production in 2017.

In March 2016, GM released photos and a short pre-production video of the Bolt at the company's Orion Assembly plant outside Detroit, testing manufacturing and tooling.
The car's user interface was developed in Israel.

Profitability 
A GM spokesman declined to comment about expected profitability. Opel refuted that in December 2016 and stated that GM has battery cell costs of $130/kWh, and industry is not yet optimized for mass production. A UBS tear-down in 2017 suggested slightly smaller losses per vehicle, of $7418 on a base spec, or $5520 on a higher spec vehicle. They estimate that by 2025 the Bolt will make a profit of about $6000 per vehicle.

Production 
Final assembly takes place at GM's Orion Assembly plant in Orion Township, Michigan, which received a  upgrade for Bolt production. Manufacture of the battery, motor, and drive unit started in August 2016 at LG, Incheon, South Korea.

The car is designed for flexible production by having some of the battery in the same position as the fuel tank in internal combustion engine-powered cars, and is made on the same assembly line as the Chevrolet Sonic at a combined rate of 90,000 per year. Although the car is assembled near Detroit, it has only 20% domestic-parts content.

Analysts expected Bolt production at 22,000 per year, and Ampera-e at a few thousand. Production may increase to 30,000 to 50,000 per year according to demand. Regular production was expected to begin in October 2016 at 25,000-30,000 the first year. Initial regular production had begun by early November 2016 at a rate of 9 per hour, gradually increasing to 30 per hour. Retail deliveries began in California in December 2016. 

Bolt production was halted on August 23, 2021, while battery production was redirected to replacements under a recall affecting the 140,000 Bolt EVs that had been produced up to that time. Production was not restarted until April 4, 2022.

In January 2022, GM announced the Orion Township factory would be retooled at a cost of $4 billion to produce Chevrolet Silverado EV and GMC Sierra EV pickup trucks, starting in 2024. The retooling would start immediately, and truck production is scheduled to start in 2024, while Bolt EV and EUV production would continue until retooling was complete. The affordable segment targeted by the Bolt is expected to be filled by the Chevrolet Equinox EV as GM transitions its EVs to Ultium technology.

Recalls 
In November 2020, 50,932 Chevrolet Bolt vehicles of model year 2017–2019 were recalled due to potential fire risk. According to GM, these vehicles contained high voltage batteries produced at LG Chem's Ochang plant that may pose a risk of fire "when charged to full, or very close to full, capacity".

As a precautionary measure, Chevrolet issued software updates that allow dealers to install a battery charge limit of 90% to their existing inventory while urging current 2017–2019 Chevy Bolt owners to enable the "Hill Top Reserve" option (2017-2018MY) or to set vehicle "Target Charge Level" (2019-2022MY) to 90%. A final software update was expected to remedy the charging capacity to 100% sometime in April 2021. , the National Highway Traffic Safety Administration has confirmed five known fires with two injuries and recommends parking recalled vehicles outside, away from homes, until they have been repaired.

On August 20, 2021, Chevrolet extended the recall to include all Bolt models (both EV and EUV) and model years (2017-2022) totaling the number of recalled Chevy Bolt cars to nearly 142,000. GM will replace the recalled vehicles' batteries, citing manufacturing defects by its partner LG, which could be responsible for the shorting of deficient battery cells. Amid further investigation, GM says it will ramp up production of replacement battery cells with LG Chem, while seeking reimbursement for the recall from the manufacturer, as GM expects the expense to be $1.8 billion.

Cars which have had the battery-replacement recall done have the  range of the 2020-up Bolt, and the new batteries are warrantied for 8 years from the date of installation.

Design 

The Bolt was designed from 2012 by a team of 180 people in GM's Korea studio (formerly Daewoo Korea), as B-segment size on its own platform, the GM BEV2. It does not share elements with the GM Gamma platform cars like the Chevrolet Sonic/Spark.

The EPA classifies the Bolt as "small station wagon", with less than 130 cu ft of interior volume. GM refers to the Bolt as a crossover and puts it under the category of SUV on its website.

The Bolt's doors, tailgate, and hood are aluminum. The driver can adjust the level of regenerative braking as the accelerator pedal is lifted. The front seats are asymmetrical to maximize cabin volume while accommodating airbags.

GM planned for over-the-air software updates during 2017 but the feature was finally released to the Bolt in April 2018.

Cruise AV (autonomous vehicle) 

The Cruise AV is a Bolt EV-based autonomous vehicle developed and tested by Cruise Automation, whose majority owner is General Motors; GM acquired Cruise in March 2016.

Pre-production versions of the Bolt EV were built at Orion Assembly in March 2016 and sent to Cruise, who modified the cars by adding sensors in San Francisco. The modified pre-production vehicles were photographed in San Francisco in May. This fleet of 50 1st-generation (G1) Bolt EV-based Cruise AVs were tested starting from June 2016 in the San Francisco Bay Area and Scottsdale, Arizona.

With the acquisition by GM in March 2016, Cruise also began working with GM engineers to develop the 2nd-generation (G2) Cruise AV, which would be assembled alongside regular production Bolt EVs at Orion Assembly. Externally, the G1 Cruise AV is equipped with two roof-mounted LIDAR sensors, has four small round headlights, and retains the Chevrolet "bowtie" logo on the front grille, while the G2 has five LIDARs and has the same styling as the regular production Bolt. A fleet of 130 G2 Cruise AVs were completed by June 2017, with an expanded, better-integrated sensor suite. The G2 (and G3) Cruise AVs are equipped with five roof-mounted LIDARs, 16 cameras, and 21 radars (both long- and short-range as well as articulating). The first G1 Cruise AV was retired and sent to the Henry Ford Museum in March 2019.

A prototype 3rd-generation (G3) Cruise AV was shown in September 2017; Cruise CEO Kyle Vogt stated the G3 AV was designed to incorporate redundant systems and was ready to be scaled up for mass production at the Orion Township factory. In addition, the G3 AV uses fault-tolerant electrical, communication, and actuation systems unique to the automated vehicle and not shared with the Bolt EV. With the completion of 50 G3 Cruise AVs in fall 2017, GM now considers the vehicle a separate model from the Bolt. Externally, the G3 Cruise AV may be distinguished from the G2 by the color of the rooftop sensor package (black on the G2, white on the G3) and the two articulating radars: on the G2, these are black and replace the side rear-view mirrors on the G2; on the G3, these are white and are mounted just above the front wheels.

Members of the press were invited to ride in a G2 Cruise AV in November 2017; they reported the choices made by the car's programming were conservative, but the self-driving system had minimal disengagements over the short  trips. In January 2018, Cruise showed renderings and a prototype of its planned 4th-generation (G4) AV, which removed the traditional driver's controls such as the steering wheel and pedals and largely retained the external features of the G2, but further development of the G4 Cruise AV was canceled to concentrate on their next generation autonomous vehicle, the Origin, which was unveiled in January 2020 and lacks driver controls entirely. The Origin is scheduled to be introduced in January 2023. Cruise received approval to test cars without safety drivers on public roads in October 2020; the first SAE Level 4 vehicles tested by Cruise were G3 AVs. The safety driver was relegated to the passenger's (right-hand) front seat and did not have access to the traditional controls.

Later in 2021, a G2 Cruise AV nicknamed "Poppy" was filmed for a short promotional video while undergoing testing in San Francisco. The California Public Utilities Commission approved Cruise's application in June 2022; with the permit, Cruise plans to start offering driverless revenue taxi services in San Francisco with Cruise AVs.

Redesign 

For the 2022 model year, the Bolt received a significant redesign to its front clip and its rear end, along with some parts of its interior. The front end carries new headlights, along with a new faux-grille and trim. The tail lights and the tailgate hatch also differ slightly from the previous model. For the interior, the shifter has been replaced with gear shifter buttons and the seats have been redesigned along with some of the interior detailing. Dimensions of the vehicle remain unchanged.

GM also added the completely separate Bolt EUV model to its electric vehicle lineup that year, which has an expanded wheelbase along with some enhanced key features.

Specifications

Battery 

The Bolt's battery uses "nickel-rich lithium-ion" chemistry, allowing the cells to run at higher temperatures than those in GM's previous electric vehicles, allowing a simpler and cheaper liquid cooling system for the  battery pack. The battery pack is a stressed member and weighs . It accounts for 23% of the car's value, and is composed of 288 flat "landscape" format cells. Cells are bundled into groups of three connected in parallel, and 96 groups connected in series compose the pack, which is rated at 160 kW peak power. GM offers a battery warranty of 8 years / , and has no plans for other battery sizes.

In October 2015, General Motors said they will purchase the Bolt's battery cells at a price of $145 per kilowatt hour from LG Chem, representing a minimum of $8,700 in revenue per car. The cost is reportedly about $100 cheaper per kWh than the price LG was giving other customers at the time. GM estimated a cell price of $130/kWh in December 2016.

While initially expected to share its lithium-ion battery technology with the second generation Chevrolet Volt, the production version of the Bolt uses batteries with a different chemistry more suited to the different charge cycles of a long-range electric vehicle, compared to the more frequent charging/discharging of hybrids and short-range EVs.

Drivetrain 

The electric motor is integrated with a single-speed transmission and differential, to form a single modular drive unit that connects directly to the front axles. The single-speed transmission has a final drive ratio of 7.05:1.

Body and chassis 

The low center of gravity is due to under-floor mounting of the battery pack.

Bolt uses the now-common kammback/hatchback low-drag body design, with sweeping curves leading to an abrupt back end. It was initially reported to have a  but GM says the final production vehicle has .

Range and efficiency 

The Ampera-e has a certified range of  under the New European Driving Cycle (NEDC) test cycle with a full battery, and achieved a range of  under the more strict Worldwide harmonized Light vehicles Test Procedures (WLTP).

Charging 

All models of Bolt support standard SAE EV charging plugs, at Level 1 or Level 2 (AC). A factory option supports Level 3 (rapid DC) charging with the SAE Combo DC system. A portable Level 1 charging adapter is supplied with each Bolt, stowed in a special compartment under the hatchback floor. It is UL Listed to operate at 120 VAC in the US market but is capable of operating at 240 VAC.

Level 1 (110 VAC) charging supplies roughly 1 kW and adds  of range per hour of charging. Level 2 (240 VAC) charging supplies up to 7.2 kW and adds  of range per hour of charging. Level 3 charging with the factory-option 55 kW SAE Combo DC fast charging system can add  of range per hour. The Bolt user manual suggests fast-charging to only 80% charge to ensure consistent 50 kW charging. The fast charge rate steps down to 38 kW at 56% charge and again to 24 kW at 68% charge. Above 85%, the charge rate varies from 16 kW to 0 kW.

Tires 

The Bolt EV is delivered with self-sealing tires whose interior surfaces are coated with a sticky compound to automatically seal small leaks and punctures in the tread area. There is no spare tire, nor is there a built-in place to store one. The car is equipped with a digital Tire Pressure Monitoring System to warn the driver if a tire is leaking, and a portable air compressor kit is supplied as an optional part.  Under the rear hatchback cargo deck, there is a space that can be used to store an undersized spare, and some owners carry a compatible Chevrolet Cruze spare tire there.

Test drives 

Several other journalists conducted a preproduction Bolt test drive on the same route, and all reported similar results regarding the Bolt EPA-estimated range.

As part of its debut at the 2016 Paris Motor Show, Opel reported driving an Ampera-e without recharging from Piccadilly Circus in London to Porte de Versailles in Paris, the venue of the exhibition.

Markets and sales

United States 

Pre-production versions of the Bolt EV were built in March 2016 and sent to Cruise Automation, which modified them as test vehicles for autonomous driving. The modified pre-production vehicles were photographed in San Francisco in May.

Ordering began in California and Oregon in mid-October 2016. Production for the model year 2017 began in November 2016. The first three Bolts were delivered in the San Francisco Bay Area on December 13, 2016, and a total of 579 units were delivered in 2016. Availability was rolled out gradually across the United States, and by August 2017 the car was available nationwide.

Demand profile did not exactly match predictions, leading GM to slow production in July 2017.  However, in the last months of 2017 Bolt demand rose rapidly; by October, it outsold any other model of electric car, including those from Tesla. Sales totaled 23,297 units in 2017, making the Bolt the U.S. second best selling plug-in car in 2017 after the Tesla Model S (≈26,500). In California, the Bolt listed as the top selling plug-in car with 13,487 units delivered, ahead of the much more expensive Tesla Model S, listed second with 11,813. The Bolt also led the state's subcompact segment in 2017, with a market share of 14.7% of all new cars sold in this category. , cumulative sales in the American market totaled 26,477 units.

In January 2019, GM reported that 2018 US sales for the Bolt totaled 18,019, down 22% from the previous year. (US sales of the Tesla Model 3, on the other hand, jumped from 1,764 in 2017 to 139,782 in 2018.) The combined sales of the Bolt and Volt also triggered the start of the full $7,500 tax credit phase out in Q4 2018, prompting the tax credit to reduce to $3,750 in April 2019 and $1,875 in October 2019 before disappearing entirely April 2020.

Canada 
The Bolt has been available in Canada since the beginning of 2017. A total of 4,025 Bolt EVs were sold in Canada in 2020.

South Korea 
In South Korea, General Motors opened the order books on March 18, 2017, and all 400 units of the first allotment were sold out in 2 hours.

European countries 
The European version began production in February 2017.

The Ampera-e launch in the Norwegian market was scheduled for April 2017, when 13 were registered. Deliveries to retail customers began on May 17, 2017. Over 4,000 cars were ordered in Norway, with some to be delivered in 2018. Registrations totaled 1,121 units in 2017.

European discontinuation controversy 

Availability was limited, as the Ampera-e and Bolt both were assembled at the same Orion Township factory. Three months later in March 2017, Groupe PSA agreed to acquire Opel, the English twin sister brand Vauxhall and the European auto lending business from General Motors as GM exited the European market; the acquisition was completed in November.

By October 2017, European sales had expanded into Switzerland, the Netherlands, and Germany; there were 4,000-5,000 orders for the Ampera-e in Norway alone, which has a population of 5.2 million. However, dealers in Europe were asked to completely stop accepting orders for the Opel Ampera-e at the same time, as the entire annual allotment for Europe had been sold and the earliest possible delivery date was pushed to 2019. The fact that Opel was limiting orders of the Ampera-e in Norway, its most promising market, led to speculation that GM was planning to discontinue the model in Europe. GM previously has been accused of purposefully sabotaging its EV1 programme, most notably in the 2006 documentary film Who Killed the Electric Car?. 

In February 2018, it was reported that 1,971 Opel Ampera-e had been sold in Europe to date. Deliveries in Norway trickled at fewer than 100 units per month in 2018. For comparison, in 2018, the Hyundai Kona Electric, equipped with a 64 kWh battery and offering comparable range to the Ampera-e, was offered for sale in Norway. The entire yearly allotment, 2,500 vehicles, was sold out almost instantly.

Sales records show that, as of February 2019, fewer than 5,000 Ampera-e vehicles were ever delivered in the entirety of Europe. Even though the Ampera-e could be ordered and bought in the Netherlands in 2019, its steep price was still an issue. In early 2020, the importer lowered the price to €34,149, which brought it closer to the official American MSRP, but still remained thousands of USD more than Americans were actually paying for the car. This was enough to put the car in the top 10 of bestselling cars in the country (regardless of the powertrain), and make it #1 among electric cars. However, the 2020 price reduction was an incentive to sell the remaining stock; as of 2020, Opel refuses to import any more Bolt/Ampera-e into the Netherlands and Germany. 

Opel/Vauxhall offered the Opel Crossland X, a gasoline- or diesel-powered crossover utility vehicle with styling mildly reminiscent of the Bolt, using a platform developed by Groupe PSA under a partnership with GM predating the acquisition. Under PSA, Opel/Vauxhall announced plans to offer EVs based on the Opel Corsa and the Peugeot 208, both being smaller cars than the Bolt. The Corsa-e went on sale in spring 2020.

Awards and recognition 

The Bolt won the 2017 Motor Trend Car of the Year award, the 2017 North American Car of the Year, the 2017 AutoGuide.com Reader's Choice Green Car of the Year, 2017 Popular Mechanics Automotive Excellence Awards Car of the Year and the Green Car Reports Best Car To Buy 2017.
The Bolt also ended up Car & Driver's '10 Best Cars' list for 2017. The Chevy Bolt also won the 2017 Green Car of the Year awarded by the Green Car Journal. It was also named by Time among its list of 25 Best Inventions of 2016, and among Popular Science 10 Greatest Automotive Innovations of 2016. The Bolt EV beat out the Cadillac CT6 and Jaguar XE to win the Detroit Free Press award for Car of the Year. Automobile included the Bolt in its 2017 All Star list.

Pre-production name confusion 

In 2015, Chevrolet acknowledged confusion between two vehicles with a similar-sounding names; Bolt and Volt.

Chevrolet's marketing chief, Tim Mahoney, subsequently announced GM would keep the Bolt name.

Autoblog projected similar confusion among European customers where the Opel Ampera-e (the Bolt variant) is just one letter off from the Opel Ampera, the previous-generation Chevrolet Volt sold in Europe – suggesting the names could confuse customers who think the new all-electric hatchback is closely related to the old plug-in hybrid hatchback.

Tata Motors has had a car named the Bolt on the market since 2014, and has registered the trademark in India and other countries.

See also 
 Chevrolet Spark EV
 General Motors EV1
 Government incentives for plug-in electric vehicles
 List of modern production plug-in electric vehicles
 List of production battery electric vehicles
 Plug-in electric vehicle

Notes and references

Note

References

Bibliography

External links 

 

Bolt
Bolt
Production electric cars
Subcompact cars
Cars introduced in 2016
Hatchbacks
2020s cars